Jean Rebort Menelas (born 11 December 1972) is a Haitian footballer who has played for the Haiti national football team. He played striker for Roulado, a club from the Gonâve Island with which he won the Ligue Haïtienne on the occasions: 2002 and 2003. For the 2002 season he was also the league's topscorer.

As of 2008, Menelas has become the all-time leading goalscorer in the Haitian top division during 14 years playing for Roulado, his only club. He is considered to be the best player in the history of Roulado, and one of the best strikers of his generation in Haiti. The club retired his number 7 jersey; the first in the history of Haitian football that a number would be permanently removed.

Club career
Jean-Robert Menelaus spent his entire career for Roulado, a club on the island of Gonâve Island, Haiti. He became the club's captain, winning the Haitian championship in consecutive years, in 2002 and 2003. In 1993, he helped lift the club to Division 1, as he finished as the top scorer in Division 2 with a record-setting 22 goals, that had withstood for eleven years before being broken by Roobens Phillogène ("Paloulou") with 23 goals for Ouanaminthe. Menelaus has registered 158 goals, with 116 coming in Division 1.

International career
Menelas has thirteen caps for the Haiti national team, scoring eight goals leading the selection to the 2000 CONCACAF Gold Cup.

International goals
Scores and results list Haiti's goal tally first.

Honours

Club 
 Ligue Haïtienne (2): 2002, 2003

Individual
 Number 7 retired by Roulado in recognition of his career in the club

Performances
 Ligue Haïtienne top goalscorer: 2002

Records
 Top goalscorer in Ligue Haïtienne: 116 goals.

References

External links
 
 
 Jean-Robert Menelas profile at Footballdatabase.eu

1972 births
Living people
Haitian footballers
Ligue Haïtienne players
Haiti international footballers
2000 CONCACAF Gold Cup players
Association football forwards